Ağalarbəyli or Agalarbeyli or Agalarbayli may refer to:

Ağalarbəyli, Azerbaijan
Agalarbeyli, Azerbaijan